is a puzzle-platformer horror video game developed by Hidetaka Suehiro's White Owls Inc. for Windows, PlayStation 4, Xbox One, and Nintendo Switch. It was published by Arc System Works and released on 11 October 2018.

Overview
The game's premise is that J.J. Macfield, the player character, is searching for her friend and love interest Emily after she goes missing on a camping trip. After J.J. is struck by lightning, she cannot die and must inflict grisly wounds on herself in order to solve the game's puzzles. Throughout, players unlock text messages that reveal her backstory and her motivation for her self-harm.

Reception

The Missing: J.J. Macfield and the Island of Memories received "generally favorable" reviews for Windows, PlayStation 4, and Xbox One, and "mixed or average" reviews for the Nintendo Switch.

Kotaku highlighted the game for being "transgressive and shockingly frank in talking about LGTBQA+ issues". Destructoid considered SWERY to borrow perhaps too heavily from Twin Peaks, but found The Missing appealing as a "brave, subtle, and at times cruel ... adventure featuring gorgeous animation, affecting visuals, and stomach-churning sound effects". EGM awarded the title four stars out of five and praised it for feeling highly personal, writing, "The Missing might be Swery's least ambitious game yet, but that's a good thing. It benefits from having a tighter gameplay focus and a clearer, more emotional message. It's still weird and meta in all the right ways, but underneath the cleverness is clarity and purpose." Eurogamer praised its depiction of social conformity, writing, "The Missing: J.J. Macfield and the Island of Memories is a brutal but beautiful tale that'll stay with you long after you lay down your controller."

The game was nominated for "Games for Impact" at The Game Awards 2018, and won both awards for "Game, Original Adventure" and "Song, Original or Adapted" with "The Missing" at the National Academy of Video Game Trade Reviewers Awards.

References

External links

2018 video games
Arc System Works games
Indie video games
Horror video games
Puzzle-platform games
LGBT-related video games
Video games developed in Japan
Video games scored by Yuji Takenouchi
Video games set on fictional islands
Windows games
Nintendo Switch games
PlayStation 4 games
Xbox One games
Transgender-related video games
Single-player video games